Thompson Island may refer to:

Thompson Island (Chile)
Thompson Island (Massachusetts)
Thompson Island (Nunavut)
Thompson Island (South Atlantic), a phantom island
Thompson Island (Antarctica)